Henry Waugh Renny-Tailyour (9 October 1849 – 15 June 1920) was a British amateur all-round sportsman who appeared for Scotland in some of the earliest international football and rugby union matches, remaining to this day the only player to have represented the country in both codes. He also played first class cricket for Kent County Cricket Club and was an accomplished athlete.

Biography 

Renny-Tailyour was born at Mussoorie, North-Western Provinces (now in Uttarakhand) in what was then British India, while his Scottish father was serving in the army there. He grew up on the family estate at Newmanswalls, Montrose, Angus, and was educated at Cheltenham College before entering the British Army, joining the Royal Engineers. A lieutenant at the time of his sporting achievements in the 1870s and 1880s, he served in New South Wales, contributing to the publication of at least two reconnaissance maps of the Sydney area, and eventually reached the rank of colonel. After retiring from army service, he became managing director of the Guinness company. He died in Montrose.

Football 

Renny-Tailyour represented the Royal Engineers regimental team in the early days of organised football, when they were one of the strongest teams in England as a result of their innovative combination game. A forward, he played in the first FA Cup Final in 1872, finishing on the losing side. The Royal Engineers lost 10 that day to the Wanderers, but returned in 1874 to face Oxford University, a match which they lost 2–0. The Engineers finally won the cup in 1875: 2–0, after a 1–1 draw, with Renny-Tailyour scoring in both matches against Old Etonians. This was his last cup final appearance.

Renny-Tailyour was selected to represent Scotland on two occasions. First he appeared against England at The Oval in London on 17 November 1871. This match, however, is not regarded as an official international, the Scottish team being entirely composed of London area residents. Renny-Tailyour was selected again in 1873, when England hosted an official international between the two countries for the first time. His residence again proved to be a factor, as the fledgling Scottish Football Association was only able to fund eight players to travel to London. It was therefore necessary to supplement the team with three others based in the south. Renny-Tailyour's goal in Scotland's 4–2 defeat at The Oval gave him the honour of scoring Scotland's first international goal.

His family connections with Montrose led to him being appointed as the local football club's Honorary President, 1887–88.

Honours 

 FA Cup 1875

Cricket 
A middle order batsman and occasional bowler, Renny-Tailyour's cricketing career was restricted by his army service. He played mostly minor cricket, for the Royal Engineers Cricket Club, I Zingari, Strathmore and Aberdeenshire, but also played at first-class cricket level, albeit only 28 matches over a period of a decade. As well as representing Kent, Renny-Tailyor appeared for the Gentlemen in Gentlemen v Players matches, and also played in first class matches for MCC, Gentlemen of the South, the South of England and a combined Kent and Gloucestershire XI.

Rugby 
Renny-Tailyour also played for the Royal Engineers on the rugby field, and represented Scotland in one of that sport's earliest internationals, against England at The Oval in 1872.

See also
 List of Scottish cricket and rugby union players
 List of Scotland international footballers born outside Scotland

References

External links
 Versatile internationals, drop goal specialists and FA Cup Final connections(Scrum.com) 

Forgotten Scotland Players: Henry Renny-Tailyour

1849 births
1920 deaths
19th-century sportsmen
Anglo-Scots
Association football forwards
Cricketers from Uttarakhand
England v Scotland representative footballers (1870–1872)
FA Cup Final players
Footballers from Uttarakhand
Gentlemen cricketers
Gentlemen of the South cricketers
Kent cricketers
Marylebone Cricket Club cricketers
North v South cricketers
People educated at Cheltenham College
People from Mussoorie
Royal Engineers A.F.C. players
Royal Engineers officers
Scotland international footballers
Scotland international rugby union players
Scottish cricketers
Scottish footballers
Scottish rugby union players
People from Montrose, Angus
Sportspeople from Angus, Scotland
British people in colonial India
Rugby union forwards
Footballers from Angus, Scotland